"Margaritaville" is a 1977 song by American popular music singer-songwriter Jimmy Buffett from the album Changes in Latitudes, Changes in Attitudes. This song was written about a drink Buffett discovered at Lung's Cocina del Sur restaurant (where High 5 is located today) at 2700 W. Anderson Lane in Austin, Texas, and the first huge surge of tourists who descended on Key West, Florida, around that time. He wrote most of the song one night at a friend's house in Austin, and finished it while spending time in Key West. In the United States "Margaritaville" reached number eight on the Billboard Hot 100 chart, and went to number one on the Easy Listening chart, also peaking at No. 13 on the Hot Country Songs chart. Billboard ranked it number 14 on its 1977 Pop Singles year-end chart. It  Buffett's highest charting solo single.

Named for the cocktail margarita, with lyrics reflecting a laid-back lifestyle in a tropical climate, "Margaritaville" has come to define Buffett's music and career. The relative importance of the song to Buffett's career is referred to obliquely in a parenthetical plural in the title of a Buffett greatest hits compilation album, Songs You Know By Heart: Jimmy Buffett's Greatest Hit(s). The name has been used in the title of other Buffett compilation albums such as Meet Me in Margaritaville: The Ultimate Collection and is also the name of several commercial products licensed by Buffett (see below). The song also lent its name to the 2017 musical Escape to Margaritaville, in which it is featured alongside other Buffett songs. Continued popular culture references to and covers of it throughout the years attest to the song's continuing popularity. The song was mentioned in Blake Shelton's 2004 single "Some Beach".

"Margaritaville" has been inducted into the 2016 Grammy Hall of Fame for its cultural and historic significance. Buffett maintains a resort chain by the same name.

Content
The song is about a man spending an entire season at a beach resort community. The three verses describe his day-to-day activities. In the first verse, he passes his time playing guitar on his front porch and watching tourists sunbathe, all the while eating sponge cake and waiting for a pot of shrimp to boil. In the second verse, he has nothing to show for his time except a tattoo of a woman that he cannot remember getting. In the third and final verse, he blew out his flip-flop, stepped on a pop-top, cuts his heel, and cruises on back home to ease his pain with a fresh batch of margaritas. When the song was used during live performances, it was changed to "I broke my leg twice, I had to limp on back home".

The three choruses reveal that the narrator is drowning his sorrows over a failed romance, and his friends are telling him that his former girlfriend is at fault. The last line of each shows his shifting attitude toward the situation: first "it's nobody's fault," then "hell, it could be my fault," and finally "it's my own damn fault."

Buffett revealed during the recording of an episode of CMT's Crossroads with the Zac Brown Band that "Margaritaville" was actually supposed to be recorded by Elvis Presley, but Presley died before the song could be recorded.

Lost verse
There is a "lost verse" to this song, as described by Buffett, which he often adds when performing in concert, which was reputedly edited out before recording the song in order to make the song more radio-friendly. The song was shortened even further for the single edit.

Old men in tank tops,
Cruisin' the gift shops,
Checkin' out chiquitas, down by the shore
They dream about weight loss,
Wish they could be their own boss
Those three-day vacations can be (or "become") such a bore

Lyric confusion
There is some confusion as to whether Buffett sings "Wasted away" or "Wastin’ away" in the chorus of the song. The original unedited lyrics, that appear on the record sleeve to the Changes in Latitudes, Changes in Attitudes LP, read "Waistin'" [sic]. Also, most guitar tablature and sheet music read "Wastin'." Buffett has never made a statement on the issue. However, he has also been known to use "wasted" in some performances, as well as in the video game re-recording for Rock Band.

Critical reception
Record World said that "Buffett turns in a melodic performance that could give him his first big hit."

Charts

Weekly charts

Year-end charts

Other versions

Single edit
When "Margaritaville" was released to radio stations in 1977, the single edit ran for 3:20, cutting out the instrumental break, and the section during the third chorus and final refrain. So the song structure changed to "riff-verse-chorus-verse-chorus-verse-chorus-riff", and the track itself was sped up at half-step. The original recording in the key of D would be E-flat.

Cover versions

In 1999, American country singer Alan Jackson covered the song on his album Under the Influence. The cover featured Buffett singing along on the third and final verse; it also peaked at No. 63 after receiving play as an album cut.

Jimmy Buffett also re-recorded this song as well as "Cheeseburger in Paradise" and "Volcano" specifically for Rock Band as downloadable content.

Parodies
In 1991, comedian Mark Eddie wrote a parody of the song titled "Marijuanaville". The song appeared on the album "Rock n' Roll Comedy Cuts Part II" (1998).
In 2006, Kenan Thompson did a parody of the song during the Weekend Update segment on Saturday Night Live, where he plays a soldier who found out he was going to the U.S.-Mexico border, rather than Baghdad. When Amy Poehler asks him what his reaction was when he discovered he was going to the border, in the next shot, he has a Corona banner above him, a sombrero on his head. He is swaying a Corona beer bottle and singing, "Wasting away again not in Iraq." This was likely a parody on Mortaritaville, which was recorded around 2 years prior.

In 2013, a parody has aired on the John Boy & Billy Big Show titled "Martinsville", referencing Martinsville Speedway.

Merchandising
As Buffett's signature song, "Margaritaville" has been used in a number of commercial ventures and product licensing tie-ins including:
 Radio Margaritaville, a radio station that broadcasts on the Internet and Sirius XM Radio
 Tales from Margaritaville, a collection of short stories by Buffett
 Jimmy Buffett's Margaritaville, a casual dining restaurant chain, tourist destination and chain of stores selling Buffett-themed franchise merchandise in Jamaica, Mexico and the U.S.  In 1985, Buffett opened a "Margaritaville" restaurant in Key West, though his first was in Gulf Shores, Alabama.
 Margaritaville margarita mix (manufactured by Mott's)
 Margaritaville tequila
 Margaritaville bottled malt beverages
 Margaritaville branded Landshark Lager
 Margaritaville Frozen Concoction Maker
 Margaritaville chips & salsa
 Margaritaville chicken wings
 Margaritaville frozen seafood
 Margaritaville Soles of the Tropics footwear
 Margaritaville men's & women's apparel
 Margaritaville outdoor & beach furniture
 Margaritaville key-lime pie filling mix
 Margaritaville beach cruiser bicycles produced by Bicycle Corporation of America, a division of Kent International

See also
List of number-one adult contemporary singles of 1977 (U.S.)

References

External links
 Jimmy Buffett' "Margaritaville" at MIX Magazine online

1977 singles
1977 songs
Jimmy Buffett songs
Alan Jackson songs
Male vocal duets
Songs about alcohol
Songs written by Jimmy Buffett
ABC Records singles
Songs about Florida